Stefan Gaisreiter (born 10 December 1947 in Murnau am Staffelsee) is a West German bobsledder who competed from the late 1960s to the late 1970s. He won a bronze medal in the four-man event at the 1972 Winter Olympics in Sapporo.

Gaisreiter also won six medals at the FIBT World Championships with two golds (Four-man: 1969, 1979), one silver (Two-man: 1979), and three bronzes (Two-man: 1977, Four-man: 1971, 1973).

References
 Bobsleigh four-man Olympic medalists for 1924, 1932-56, and since 1964
 Bobsleigh two-man world championship medalists since 1931
 Bobsleigh four-man world championship medalists since 1930
 DatabaseOlympics.com profile

1947 births
Bobsledders at the 1968 Winter Olympics
Bobsledders at the 1972 Winter Olympics
German male bobsledders
Olympic bobsledders of West Germany
Olympic bronze medalists for West Germany
Living people
People from Garmisch-Partenkirchen (district)
Sportspeople from Upper Bavaria
Olympic medalists in bobsleigh
Medalists at the 1972 Winter Olympics